MeyGen (full name MeyGen tidal energy project) will be the world's largest tidal energy plant, which is currently in construction. The first phase of the project uses four 1.5MW turbines with  rotor diameter turbines submerged on the seabed. The project is owned and run by Tidal Power Scotland Limited and Scottish Enterprise.

In October 2010, the newly named "MeyGen" tidal project from the nearby Castle of Mey and "Gen" for generation was created by a consortium of Atlantis Resources Limited, Morgan Stanley and received operational lease from the Crown Estate to a 400MW project for 25years. Phase 1 (formerly called Phase 1a) began operations in April 2018. In July 2022, MeyGEN plc was awarded a contract for 28MW in the Contract for difference (CFD) Allocation Round 4,  which will be used to support the construction of Phase 2 which is now due to be commissioned in 2027. The site has consent for a further 52MW, to be developed as Phase 3, supported by future CFD Allocation Rounds. The site has the potential for a further 312MW to be deployed beyond that, subject to expanding the consent.

In December 2016 it was announced that the first turbine had begun full power operations, and all four turbines were installed by February 2017. Atlantis plans for 400MW. , the four turbines have produced 8GWh. In 2019, they produced 13.8 GWh.

The project received £1.5million Scottish Government grant in 2020.

References 

Tidal power stations in Scotland